Defending champion John McEnroe defeated Ivan Lendl in a rematch of the previous year's final, 7–5, 6–0, 6–4 to win the singles title at the 1984 Volvo Masters.

Draw

Finals

See also
ATP World Tour Finals appearances

References
1984 Masters-Singles

Singles

fr:Masters de tennis masculin 1984